During the parade of nations section of the 1976 Summer Olympics opening ceremony, athletes from each country participating in the Olympics paraded in the arena, preceded by their flag. The flag was borne by a sportsperson from his or her respective country chosen either by the National Olympic Committee or by the athletes themselves to represent their country.

Parade order
As the nation of the first modern Olympic Games, Greece entered the stadium first; whereas, the host nation Canada marched last, in accordance with the tradition and IOC guidelines. As each delegation entered accompanied by the music to be composed by Vic Vogel, the national name was announced in French and English (the official languages of the Olympics).

Whilst most countries entered under their short names, a few entered under acronyms or alternative names, mostly due to political and naming disputes. West Germany (Federal Republic of Germany) entered as Allemagne (République Federal de Allemagne), East Germany (German Democratic Republic) as République Démocratique Allemande, North Korea (Democratic People's Republic of Korea) as R.P.D. Corée (République Populaire Démocratique de Corée), and Soviet Union (Union of Soviet Socialist Republics) as U.R.S.S. (Union des Républiques Socialistes Soviétiques). 

Ninety-two nations entered the stadium with a combined total of 6,084 athletes. Four of them made their Olympic debut, namely Andorra (which had its overall Olympic debut a few months before in Innsbruck), Antigua and Barbuda (as Antigua), Cayman Islands, and Papua New Guinea. Because of the 1976 Summer Olympics boycott, several African countries which marched at the parade eventually withdrew from the Games, including Cameroon, Morocco, and Tunisia.  Senegal and Ivory Coast were the only African countries that competed throughout the duration of the Games. Elsewhere, Burma, Iraq and Guyana also opted to join the Congolese-led boycott. Other countries, such as El Salvador and Zaire, did not participate in Montreal for purely economic reasons.

List
The following is a list of each country's announced flag bearer. The list is sorted by the order in which each nation appears in the parade of nations. The names are given in their official designations by the IOC.

This table is sortable by country name (in French), the flag bearer's name, and the flag bearer's sport.

Notes

References

1976 Summer Olympics
Lists of Olympic flag bearers